Manure management refers to capture, storage, treatment, and utilization of animal manures in an environmentally sustainable manner.   It can be retained in various holding facilities. Animal manure (also referred to as animal waste) can occur in a liquid, slurry, or solid form.  It is utilized by distribution on fields in amounts that enrich soils without causing water pollution or unacceptably high levels of nutrient enrichment.  Manure management is a component of nutrient management.

In confined spaces the gasses from manure can lethally asphyxiate humans. There is also a drowning danger.

Risks posed by gases in livestock manure

Livestock manure produces several gases including four main toxic gases, hydrogen sulfide, methane, ammonia and carbon dioxide. In animal housing it is very common in swine and beef breeding to have manure storage under the building's floor. In this setup low concentrations of these toxic gases are commonly noted throughout the year. The highest concentrations of these gases are noted during manure agitation, stirring the manure to homogenize the manure for pumping out of the storage. During these times the concentrations easily approach levels that can pose health issues to the workers and animals in the facilities.

Hydrogen sulfide

Hydrogen Sulfide, is a naturally occurring gas that is flammable, colorless and poisonous. H2S has a characteristic rotten egg smell, though pungent at first it quickly deadens the sense of smell. People are typically only able to smell  at low concentrations.  is heavier than air causing the gas to travel close to the ground and collect in low-lying areas. Common names for hydrogen sulfide include hydrosulfuric acid (the product of it reacting with water), stink damp and sewer gas.

Sources of hydrogen sulfide exposure

Hydrogen sulfide naturally occurs in hot springs, crude petroleum and natural gas.  is also produced from the bacterial breakdown of animal and human wastes and organic materials in the absence of oxygen (anaerobic digestion).  is also a common metabolic end product of sulfate reducing bacteria which convert sulfates and hydrocarbons into carbon dioxide and hydrogen sulfide in the absence of free oxygen. There are multiple industrial sources of hydrogen sulfide. Such sources include: natural gas/petroleum drilling and refining, wastewater treatment, coke ovens, tanneries and paper mills. Hydrogen sulfide is found in hydrocarbons both directly as an impurity and is produced by sulfate reducing microorganisms which can "eat" methane or other hydrocarbons, using sulfate as the electron receptor, similar to how aerobic metabolism uses oxygen. Other non-industrial sources of  include emissions from livestock facilities and the land applications of animal manure. During the agitation or mixing of swine manure in a deep pit storage system the concentration of hydrogen sulfide was observed in one study at levels exceeding 300 ppm inside the barn. In a study examining the concentration of hydrogen sulfide in a residential cohort during manure application, it was reported the levels never exceeded the Agency for Toxic Substances and Disease Registry acute exposure MRL of 70 ppb and only 14 readings at 1-minute intervals reported levels above the intermediate exposure MRL of 20 ppb. There are currently strong recommendations from both Pork Producer Associations and Land Grant Universities that suggest having to employees in a barn during agitation and pumping, maintain proper ventilation levels during agitation and pumping of manure, and to not enter a manure storage without proper equipment and training.

Effects

Acute

Hydrogen sulfide is most commonly inhaled, though through prolonged exposure skin and eye irritations resulting in painful dermatitis and burning eyes can occur. Symptoms of acute exposure include nausea, headaches, disturbed equilibrium, tremors, convulsions and skin and eye irritations. At high levels, inhalation of hydrogen sulfide will result in unconsciousness and death due to its effect on the body resulting in the lack of oxygen use in the cells. the typical odor threshold for H2S is 0.01 to 1.5 ppm with the loss of smell occurring at levels around levels of 100 to 150 ppm. Concentrations of 500 to 700 ppm can result in death within 30 to 60 minutes, 700 to 1000 ppm result in death within minutes, while death is nearly instantaneous at levels of 1000 to 2000 ppm.

Chronic

Chronic exposure to hydrogen sulfide can cause several long term health issues, though  does not accumulate in the body. Repeated or prolonged exposures have been reported to cause low blood pressure, headache, loss of appetite, chronic cough, inflammation of the eye membrane, weight loss and ataxia.

Regulations for exposures

The Occupational Safety and Health Administration (OSHA) and National Institute for Occupational Safety and Health (NIOSH) have set recommended exposure limits (REL NIOSH) and permissible exposure limits (PEL OSHA) for  exposure in the workplace. NIOSH's REL for a 10-minute maximum exposure is 10 ppm, OSHA's PEL for general industry, i.e. agriculture, construction, etc., is 20 ppm and OSHA's PEL levels are enforceable. NIOSH also reports an IDLH or immediately dangerous to life and health, at 100 ppm, this is the level at which the effects of exposure would interfere with a person's ability to escape.

See also
Manure
Concentrated Animal Feeding Operation
Animal feeding operation
Slurry pit
Atmospheric methane

References 

 Report for Congress: Agriculture: A Glossary of Terms, Programs, and Laws, 2005 Edition

External links
Animal Manure Management on http://eXtension.org
Animal Manure Management on http://eXtension.org
Animal Manure Nutrient Management on http://eXtension.org

Agricultural soil science
Feces
Organic fertilizers
Livestock